The English Reformation Parliament, which sat from 3 November 1529 to 14 April 1536, was the English Parliament that passed the major pieces of legislation leading to the Break with Rome and establishment of the Church of England. In Scotland, the 1560 Parliament had a similar role. Sitting in the reign of King Henry VIII of England, the Reformation Parliament was the first to deal with major religious legislation, much of it orchestrated by Thomas Cromwell.

Background
By the mid-1520s, King Henry VIII was in desperate need of a male heir. His wife, Catherine of Aragon, was increasingly considered to be past child-bearing age, and in Henry’s mind, having a female on the throne (i.e, his only legitimate heir, later Mary I of England) would destabilize the country. Henry then concluded that a divorce was needed and sent Cardinal Wolsey to negotiate with Pope Clement VII. 

Wolsey was unable to convince Clement to grant a divorce. Frustrated with Wolsey, Henry then turned to combating the influence and the benefits that the Catholic clergy enjoyed in England, hoping that pressure on the Church would influence the Pope to support his cause. However, England was not all that powerful and important enough in Europe at this time for the Pope to pay it much attention.

Henry then consulted with his advisors including Thomas Cromwell to address the influence of canonical law in England.  Henry called Parliament to session in 1529; the subsequent 8 sessions of Parliament through 1536 began the separation of canonical law from statutory law in England.

Acts
The major pieces of legislation from the Reformation Parliament included:

1529 Clergy legal privilege removed
An Act was passed to prevent the clergy from being subject to separate canonical courts. Instead, they were now to be trialled in the same way as everybody else in England was and not be looked upon favourably by the courts.

1530 Praemunire charges reinstated
The Parliament accepted the reinstatement of the charge named Praemunire where individuals could be convicted of a crime for appealing to any power outside of the realm for resolution of a situation within England. In particular, the law was aimed at those recognising the pope's authority. The law gave leave that charges could be dropped if fines of £118,000 were paid.

1532 Rome deprived of a portion of Annates normally remitted
The session of 1532 saw plan and purpose that had not been evident in earlier sessions.

The first Act of Annates (the Act in Conditional Restraint of Annates) was passed allowing only 5% of the money normally remitted to Rome. Annates were monies (church taxes effectively) that were collected in England and sent to Rome. They were levied on any diocese by Rome as payment in return for the nomination and papal authorization  for the consecration of a bishop. One third of the first year's revenues from the particular diocese went to Rome. The King passed legislation threatening to deprive the pope of these revenues. During this year even more intensive work was done to try to get Pope Clement to agree to the divorce Henry required. The Parliament threatened that if Henry did not get his annulment/divorce within a year, then all payments to Rome would be stopped. The anti-clerical Act titled Supplication Against the Ordinaries was also passed.

1533 All appeals to Rome, religious or otherwise forbidden
The Annates threat was carried out but not yet legalised by Parliament. Cromwell's Act in Restraint of Appeals was passed, preparing the way for further Praemunire charges against leading Catholic clergy and nobles who disagreed with the King's wish to divorce.

1534 Act Concerning Peter's Pence and Dispensations
Payment of Peter's Pence (a tax collected annually from householders) to the See of Rome was abolished. The Act also eradicated pluralism in the clergy (the right to hold more than one parish) and forbade English clergy from attending religious assemblies abroad.

1534 Act of Succession
Declared Henry VIII and Catherine of Aragon's marriage invalid and Mary as the illegitimate product of this marriage. The Act of Succession secured the children of Henry and Anne Boleyn to which the whole nation had to swear an oath by. To reject the oath was made treasonous.

1534 Act of Supremacy; Annates reserved to the English Crown
The second Act of Annates was passed, called the  Act in Absolute Restraint of Annates. The annates were, along with the supremacy over the church in England, reserved to the crown, and the English crown now took all revenue charged for the appointment of bishops. The Act of First Fruits and Tenths transferred the taxes on ecclesiastical income from the pope to the crown. The Treasons Act 1534 made it high treason punishable by death to deny royal supremacy. The first  Act of Supremacy (among other things) began the process by which the dissolution of monasteries was to be undertaken. It quickly followed the receipt of a survey called Valor Ecclesiasticus, but applied only to religious houses with an income of less than two hundred pounds a year.

See also
Scottish Reformation Parliament, commencing 1560

References

 

1529 establishments in England
16th-century English parliaments
Anglicanism
History of Christianity in England
English Reformation
Protestantism in the United Kingdom
Anti-Catholicism in England
Anti-Catholicism in Wales
History of the Church of England
History of Catholicism in England
Parliament of England
Political history of England
Religion and politics